Georg Plock (1865–1930) was a former pastor and a gay rights advocate from Germany.

Life
Plock studied Protestant theology, becoming a parish pastor. He was later discovered having a homosexual affair and arrested and sentenced to prison. After his imprisonment, liberal politician and pastor Friedrich Naumann asked Magnus Hirschfeld to "look after him".

From 1919 to 1923, he was the chief secretary for the Scientific-Humanitarian Committee and  had worked along with the physician Ernst Burchard and Baron Hermann von Teschenberg. In 1923, he took over as editor of the homosexual journal Die Freundschaft (Friendship).

References
 Wolff, Charlotte. Magnus Hirschfeld: a portrait of a pioneer in sexology. Quartet Books, 1986. pp. 173, 221-2. 
 Lauritsen, John; Thorstad, David. The early homosexual rights movement (1864-1935). Times Change Press, 1974. p. 10.

External links

 Profile of Georg Plock at hirschfeld.in-berlin.de
 Leaders of the Scientific-Humanitarian Committee (photograph)

1865 births
German Protestant clergy
German editors
German LGBT rights activists
1930 deaths